Moneymaker or Money Maker may refer to:

Surname
 Chris Moneymaker (born 1975), American poker player
Moneymaker effect
 Kelly Moneymaker (born 1970), American singer

Music 
Money Maker (Re-Loaded), 2012 album from Froggy Fresh 
"Money Maker", 1994 song by The NPG
"Money Maker", 2006 song by Ludacris
"The Moneymaker", 2007 song by Rilo Kiley
"Money Maker", a 2011 song by The Black Keys from their El Camino
"Moneymaker", a 2012 song by Diego's Umbrella from their album Proper Cowboy

Other uses
 The Moneymaker tomato, an heirloom tomato cultivar
"The Moneymaker", a 1956 episode of The 20th Century-Fox Hour
 The Moneymakers, 1960s Canadian game show
 Moneymakers, 1970s Canadian business television series

See also
 Shake Your Moneymaker (disambiguation)
 Money